The Uganda Film Festival Award for Best Supporting Actor is an award presented annually by Uganda Communications Commission (UCC) to a male supporting actor (actress) for their outstanding acting in a film support role at the Uganda Film Festival Awards. The category was introduced in 2015 but was suspended in 2016 and 2017 and re-introduced in 2018.

Winners and nominees
The table shows the winners and nominees for the Best Supporting Actor award.

Multiple wins and nominations
No actor has won this category multiple times. The following actors have received two or more Best Supporting Actor nominations

References

Ugandan film awards